Barberier is a commune in the Allier department in the Auvergne-Rhône-Alpes region of central France.

Geography
Access to the commune is by the D36 road from Étroussat in the west which passes through the centre of the commune and the village and continues east to join the D2009 east of the commune. The D183 comes from Bayet in the north and also passes through the centre of the commune, intersecting the D36 at the village, continuing south to join the D66 south of the commune. Apart from the village there are the hamlets of Les Varennes in the south, La Grange Neuve in the east, and Bompré in the north.

The Sioule river flows north along the south-eastern border of the commune and continues north to join the Allier north-east of Contigny.

History
Barberier appears as Barbrier on the 1750 Cassini Map and the same the 1790 version.

Administration

List of Successive Mayors

Demography
In 2017 the commune had 143 inhabitants.

Sites and monuments
There are two sites in the commune that are registered as historical monuments:
The Château of Bompré (15th century)
The old Church of Saint André (12th century)

See also
Communes of the Allier department

Bibliography
 Raymond d'Azémar, Étroussat, Barberier. Municipal Chronicles from the Revolution to today, Montluçon, 1983

References

Communes of Allier